Mohtashim Rasheed Dar (born 22 September 1968), known as Mohtashim Rasheed, also spelled as Mauhtashim Rasheed, is a Pakistani cricket coach and a former cricketer.

Domestic career
Rasheed made his List A debut for House Building Finance Corporation against the National Bank of Pakistan on 29 October 1993 in the Patron's Trophy. He made his first-class debut for House Building Finance Corporation against United Bank Limited on 6 November 1993 in the Patron's Trophy. Rasheed played domestic cricket until 2005.

Coaching career
Rasheed first served as Pakistan's fielding coach from 2007 to 2008. He was appointed Pakistan's assistant coach for the 2009 ICC Champions Trophy. Rasheed served as the Pakistan women's team's head coach from 2012 to 2016. He served in Peshawar Zalmi's coaching staff for the 2017 PSL. Rasheed was appointed the coach of the Qatari cricket team for the duration of the 2017 ICC World Cricket League Division Five. Rasheed served as Muzaffarabad Tigers' head coach in 2021. Rasheed coached South Coast Sapphires during the 2022 FairBreak Invitational T20.

References

External links
 
 Mohtashim Rasheed at Pakistan Cricket Board

1968 births
Baluchistan cricketers
Cricketers from Karachi
House Building Finance Corporation cricketers
Hyderabad (Pakistan) cricketers
Karachi Blues cricketers
Living people
Pakistani cricket coaches
Pakistani cricketers
Pakistan Customs cricketers
Pakistan National Shipping Corporation cricketers
Pakistan Super League coaches